Martin Samuel (born 25 July 1964) is an English sports columnist for News UK. He has previously worked for The Daily Mail, The Times, News of the World, GQ Magazine,The Tortoise, Jewish Chronicle, Daily Express, The Sun and Sunday People. Samuel was an occasional guest on the Sunday Supplement television show.  On 20 December 2022, Samuel announced his final column for the Daily Mail, joining The Times, Sunday Times and TalkSPORT owner News UK in January, 2023.

Career 
Samuel began his career at Hayters news agency in London. He wrote for several national newspapers in the UK before he settled initially at The Times, where he was named Sports Writer of the Year at the British Press Awards in 2007, and Sports Journalist of the Year at the British Sports Journalism Awards in 2005, 2006 and 2007. He was also Sports Journalist of the Year at the 'What The Papers Say' awards in 2002, 2005 and 2006. He moved to the Daily Mail in 2008, replacing the paper's sports columnist, Paul Hayward, who was returning to The Guardian.

During his time at the Daily Mail, Samuel was again named Sports Journalist of the Year at the British Sports Journalism Awards in 2010 and 2013, Sports Writer of the Year at the British Press Awards in 2013, and Sports Commentator of the Year at the Editorial Intelligence Comment Awards in 2014. In 2012, Samuel was named top in a UK Press Gazette poll of Britain's best sports journalists. In January 2015, he was named in Debrett's List of the 500 Most Influential People in Britain.

Samuel ghostwrote Harry Redknapp's autobiography, Always Managing, published in 2013  and its follow-up, 'A Man Walks On To A Pitch', published a year later. He also wrote a book with Malcolm Macdonald, "How To Score Goals", published in 1985.

Awards
Sports Writer of the Year, What the Papers Say awards (2002)
Sports Writer of the Year, Football Supporters' Federation, 2003
Sports Writer of the Year, What the Papers Say awards (2005)
Sports Writer of the Year, What the Papers Say awards (2006)
Sports Writer of the Year, Sports Journalists' Association of Great Britain (2005)
Sports Writer of the Year, Sports Journalists' Association of Great Britain (2006)
Sports Writer of the Year, Sports Journalists' Association of Great Britain (2007)
Sports Journalist of the Year, Sports Journalists' Association of Great Britain, 2010
Sports Journalist of the Year, Sports Journalists' Association of Great Britain, 2013
Sports Journalist of the Year, British Press Awards (2008)
Sports Journalist of the Year, British Press Awards (2013)
Sports Commentator of the Year at the Editorial Intelligence Comment Awards in 2014
Sports Writer of the Year, Sports Journalists' Association of Great Britain, 2014
Sports Columnist of the Year, Sports Journalists' Association of Great Britain, 2014 
Live Reporter of the Year, Sports Journalists' Association of Great Britain, 2021

References

External links 
 Martin Samuel - Daily Mail articles

Living people
British sportswriters
British Jews
Place of birth missing (living people)
Daily Mail journalists
1964 births